The Charles Penn Edmunds House, on Rocky Hill Road / Kentucky Route 1297 in Barren County, Kentucky near Beckton, is a Federal-style brick house which was built in c.1836-37.  It was listed on the National Register of Historic Places in 1983.

Captain William Edmunds received this land as a military grant;  his grandson Charles Penn Edmunds built the house.  The house has ption Flemish bond brickwork at the front and common bond on the sides.

References

Houses on the National Register of Historic Places in Kentucky
Federal architecture in Kentucky
Houses completed in 1837
National Register of Historic Places in Barren County, Kentucky
1837 establishments in Kentucky